Pishill with Stonor is a civil parish in the high Chilterns, South Oxfordshire. It includes the villages of Pishill (Ordnance Survey grid reference SU727899) and Stonor (OS Grid ref. SU737886), and the hamlets of Maidensgrove and Russell's Water. Pishill with Stonor was formed by the merger of the separate civil parishes of Pishill and Stonor (until 1896 a detached part of the parish of Pyrton) in 1922.  In 2011 it had a human population of 304 across its 10.54 km².

Sources

References

Civil parishes in Oxfordshire
South Oxfordshire District